The 2017 Abierto Tampico was a professional tennis tournament played on outdoor hard courts. It was the fifth edition of the tournament and was part of the 2017 ITF Women's Circuit. It took place in Tampico, Mexico, on 18–24 September 2017.

Singles main draw entrants

Seeds 

 1 Rankings as of 11 September 2017.

Other entrants 
The following players received a wildcard into the singles main draw:
  Zoë Kruger
  María José Portillo Ramírez
  Urszula Radwańska
  Fanny Stollár

The following players received entry from the qualifying draw:
  Aliona Bolsova Zadoinov
  Maria Mateas
  Alexandra Morozova
  Luisa Stefani

The following player received entry as a lucky loser:
  Catherine Leduc

Champions

Singles

 Irina Falconi def.  Louisa Chirico, 7–5, 6–7(3–7), 6–1

Doubles
 
 Caroline Dolehide /  María Irigoyen def.  Kaitlyn Christian /  Giuliana Olmos, 6–4, 6–4

External links 
 2017 Abierto Tampico at ITFtennis.com
 Official website

2017 ITF Women's Circuit
2017 in Mexican tennis
Abierto Tampico